Eckhart Nickel (born 1966) is a German author and journalist.

Nickel was born in Frankfurt am Main.  After studying art history and literature in Heidelberg and New York City, he worked at various media outlets including the German lifestyle magazine Tempo, Arte television in Strasbourg, and Architectural Digest.  His writings were published in the weekend editions of the Süddeutsche Zeitung and Frankfurter Allgemeine Zeitung.  He was also editor-in-chief of the acclaimed literary magazine Der Freund, a collaboration with Swiss writer Christian Kracht (the magazine's publisher), which was created in Kathmandu and published from September 2004 to June 2006.  From January to October 2007 he was in charge of lifestyle writing for the Saturday supplement of the Süddeutsche Zeitung. He is a resident of Sonoma County, California.

At the start of his career Nickel was classified in the so-called "pop literature" genre of contemporary German writing; his works are chiefly concerned with the fate of modern man in a state of rebellion.  Initially highly self-referential, one reviewer has noted a "more serious undertone" to his more recent works.

References

External links
Works by and about Eckhart Nickel in the catalogue of the German National Library. 

1966 births
Living people
German male writers